Thaneswar Basumatary is a Bodoland People's Front politician from Assam. He has been elected in Assam Legislative Assembly election in 2016 from Chapaguri constituency.
Previously he has been MLA from the same constituency in 2006 from Bodoland People's Front .

Background
He was born to father Lt. Golak Basumatary and mother Lt. Thaoni Basumatary in Barpam Village. He completed his schooling from Barpam Gudi Poraisali and Chapaguri Kolklabari ME & High School. His highest qualification is Bachelor of Science. After his graduation he served as a science teacher in Chapaguri Kolklabari ME & High School before contesting his first Assam Legislative Assembly election in the year 2006. His hobbies include playing various games like football, volleyball, and carrom. He is married since 1990 to Smt. Rajo Basumatary and they together have 3 children (2 sons and a daughter). He contests from 63 No. Chapaguri (ST) constituency and represents Bodoland People's Front at the Assam Legislative Assembly.

References 

Living people
Bodoland People's Front politicians
Assam MLAs 2016–2021
People from Baksa district
1966 births